Henry Ferrier (20 May 1920 – 16 October 2002) was a Scottish professional footballer and manager who made over 240 appearances in the Football League for Portsmouth as a left back. He later managed Gloucester City and Chelmsford City in non-League football.

Personal life 
Ferrier was a Heart of Midlothian supporter. He was married with three children and served in the Royal Artillery during the Second World War. After leaving football, he worked in the commercial department for Essex County Cricket Club and as a crane driver.

Career statistics

Honours

As a player 
Portsmouth

 Football League First Division (2): 1948–49, 1949–50
 FA Charity Shield (1): 1949 (Shared)

As a manager 
Chelmsford City

 Southern League Premier Division (1): 1967–68
 Southern League Cup (1): 1959–60
 Eastern Floodlight Cup (1): 1966–67

References 

English Football League players
Brentford F.C. wartime guest players
Scottish footballers
1920 births
2002 deaths
Military personnel from Edinburgh
Association football fullbacks
Footballers from Edinburgh
Portsmouth F.C. players
Gloucester City A.F.C. players
Gloucester City A.F.C. managers
Chelmsford City F.C. managers
Southern Football League players
Southern Football League managers
Watford F.C. wartime guest players
Scottish football managers
Tottenham Hotspur F.C. wartime guest players
Royal Artillery personnel
British Army personnel of World War II
Reading F.C. wartime guest players
Portsmouth F.C. wartime guest players
West Ham United F.C. wartime guest players
Barnsley F.C. wartime guest players
Millwall F.C. wartime guest players